Daniel Klein (born May 23, 1946) is an American bassist best known as a member of The J. Geils Band.

Early life
Daniel Klein was born on May 23, 1946, in the Bronx, New York City. He moved to New Jersey at age 6 and in 1964 he began attending Worcester Polytechnic Institute in Massachusetts studying mechanical engineering. It was there that he met musicians John Geils and Richard Salwitz. By 1966 Klein left WPI to pursue a career in music.

Musical career
While attending college Klein formed a jug band with Salwitz and Geils. When Peter Wolf, Seth Justman and Stephen Jo Bladd joined they changed their name to The J. Geils Band of which Klein remained a member until their breakup in 1985. Throughout the 1970s, 80s and 90s Klein recorded with artists such as Buddy Guy, Junior Wells and Debbie Davies. He has rejoined The J. Geils Band in all of their reunions and leads his own band, Danny Klein's Full House, which performs J. Geils Band songs.

Personal life

Klein is Jewish.

References

External links
Danny Klein Official Website
Danny Klein's Full House Official Website

1946 births
Jewish American musicians
Living people
American rock bass guitarists
American male bass guitarists
The J. Geils Band members
20th-century American bass guitarists
20th-century American male musicians
21st-century American Jews